The Capio Ögon Trophy is a women's professional golf tournament on the Swedish Golf Tour, first played in 1996. It became a LET Access Series event in 2020. It is always held in Uppsala, Sweden.

Played at Upsala Golf Club, the club had previous experience hosting the Upsala Golf International on the Challenge Tour in 1992 and 1993.

The event was introduced on the 1996 Swedish Golf Tour as one of four new tournaments alongside Toyota Ladies Open, Öijared Ladies Open and Delsjö Ladies Open (last played in 1988). 

In 1998, Marie Hedberg won while still a student at San Jose State, and only narrowly lost out on the Player of the Year title to runner-up Nina Karlsson.

In 2020, Linn Grant claimed her first professional victory at the event.

Winners

See also
Upsala Golf International – men's event (Challenge Tour)

References

External links

LET Access Series events
Swedish Golf Tour (women) events
Golf tournaments in Sweden